Lamprosema infuscalis is a moth in the family Crambidae. It was described by George Hampson in 1904. It is found on the Bahamas.

References

Moths described in 1904
Lamprosema
Moths of the Caribbean